António da Rocha Morais (30 December 1934 – 1 July 1989) was a Portuguese football forward and manager, best known for his association with FC Porto. 

Morais died as a result of a car accident in 1989 at the age of 54.

Honours

Player
Porto
Primeira Liga: 1958–59
Portuguese Cup: 1957–58

Manager
Porto
Portuguese Cup: 1983–84
Portuguese Supercup: 1983
UEFA Cup Winners' Cup runner-up: 1983–84

Managerial statistics

See also 
List of Taça de Portugal winning managers
List of Supertaça Cândido de Oliveira winning managers

References

External links

António Morais at Zerozero

1934 births
1989 deaths
Portuguese footballers
Sportspeople from Vila Nova de Gaia
Association football forwards
FC Porto players
S.C. Braga players
F.C. Tirsense players
Primeira Liga players
Primeira Liga managers
Portuguese football managers
FC Porto managers
Vitória S.C. managers
Rio Ave F.C. managers
Sporting CP managers
Leixões S.C. managers
Road incident deaths in Portugal